The second season of the American science fiction television series Defiance premiered on Syfy in its new Thursday night timeslot June 19, 2014 and ended on August 28, 2014. The show consisted a total of 13 episodes. The show stars Grant Bowler, Julie Benz, Stephanie Leonidas, Tony Curran, Jamie Murray, Graham Greene, Jesse Rath and James Murray.

The series is produced by Universal Cable Productions, in transmedia collaboration with Trion Worlds, who have released an MMORPG video game of the same name which is tied into the series.

Cast

Main cast 
 Grant Bowler as Joshua Nolan
 Julie Benz as Amanda Rosewater
 Stephanie Leonidas as Irisa Nyira
 Tony Curran as Datak Tarr
 Jaime Murray as Stahma Tarr
 Graham Greene as Rafe McCawley
 Jesse Rath as Alak Tarr
 James Murray as Niles Pottinger

Recurring cast 
 Trenna Keating as Doc Yewll
Dewshane Williams as Tommy LaSalle
Justin Rain as Quentin McCawley
 Nicole Muñoz as Christie McCawley Tarr
 Gale Harold as Connor Lang
 William Atherton as Viceroy Mercado
 Linda Hamilton as Pilar McCawley
 Anna Hopkins as Jessica "Berlin" Rainer
 Noah Danby as Sukar
 Ryan Kennedy as Josef
Kristina Pesic as Deirdre Lamb
Douglas Nyback as Sgt. Frei Poole
 Robin Dunne as Cai / Reimlu
 America Olivo as Alethea

Guest stars
 Mia Kirshner as Kenya Rosewater

Episodes

Production
Syfy renewed the show for a second season on May 10, 2013. Production began in Toronto in August 2013, one month after the season one finale. William Atherton and Anna Hopskins' castings were announced on September 5, 2013 while season 2 was in production.
James Murray joined the main cast as Defiance's new mayor Niles Pottinger. In addition, Jesse Rath was promoted to series regular. Season one guest star Robin Dunne returned as two different characters. Noah Danby's character was originally going to get killed last season, but was brought back for season 2 due to the praise Danby received for his performance.

Home media 

Note

References

External links 

2014 American television seasons
Defiance (TV series)